Córas Iompair Éireann (Irish Transport Company), or CIÉ, is a statutory corporation of Ireland, answerable to the Irish Government and responsible for most public transport within the republic and jointly with its Northern Ireland counterpart, the Northern Ireland Transport Holding Company for the railway service between the Republic of Ireland and Northern Ireland. The company is headquartered at Heuston Station, Dublin. It is a statutory corporation whose members are appointed by the Minister for Transport.

Services

Since the enactment of the Transport (Re-organisation of Córas Iompair Éireann) Act, 1986 CIÉ has been the holding company for Bus Éireann, Dublin Bus and Iarnród Éireann/Irish Rail, the three largest internal transport companies in Ireland. It was originally to have operated the Luas tram system in Dublin, but that project was transferred to the newly created Railway Procurement Agency.

CIÉ's services are provided through three operating companies:
 Dublin Bus, which provides bus services in the Greater Dublin area, including most bus services within Dublin city and the former County Dublin;
 Bus Éireann, which provides intercity and regional bus services outside Dublin city and county and from Dublin to the rest of the country, as well as operating the city buses in Cork, Limerick, Waterford, and Galway and a number of other small urban bus systems;
 Iarnród Éireann/Irish Rail, which operates InterCity, Commuter and DART trains, and – together with NI Railways – the Dublin–Belfast Enterprise train service. Iarnród Éireann also operates Rosslare Europort.

CIÉ is responsible for the overall strategy of the group. It owns all fixed assets used by the three companies, such as railway lines and stations, the latter being dealt with through the Group Property division. It also operates an international tour division, CIÉ Tours International. CIÉ's vast number of advertising sites are organised through Commuter Advertising Network (CAN), since the mid-1990s employing an external company (currently Exterion Media Ireland) to manage them. There are also a number of shared services provided by CIÉ to its three operating companies.

Other than in the railway sector CIÉ is not a monopoly provider of public transport services: a number of other operators exist; however, under the Transport Act, 1932, these may not compete directly on any route for which CIÉ has been granted a licence. However, legislation was enacted in 2013 to provide for the tendering of 10% of routes operated by Dublin Bus and Bus Éireann. This public competition includes these two operators, along with private operators such as Go-Ahead Ireland, and was completed in January 2019.

History

Córas Iompair Éireann was formed as a private company by the Transport Act 1944 and incorporated the Great Southern Railways Company and Dublin United Transport Company, adopting the logo of the latter company, the so-called "flying snail". [Great Southern Railways](GSR) was incorporated in 1925, having been Great Southern Railway since 1924. Essentially the GSR became – especially as it started to broaden its business interests into road transport – a monopoly transport operator. The Transport Act 1950 amalgamated CIÉ and the Grand Canal Company and formally nationalised CIÉ, changing its structure from that of a private limited company to a corporation under a board appointed by the Minister for Transport. The Northern Ireland Great Northern Railway Act, 1958 transferred the lines of Great Northern Railway Board south of the border to CIÉ.
Until 1986 CIÉ operated as a single legal entity, although it was internally organised into rail services and two bus divisions – Dublin City Services and Provincial Services. The vast majority of services were branded CIÉ, although long-distance provincial buses were branded "Expressway" and Dublin electric trains DART. In 1987 CIÉ was reorganised into a holding company and three operating companies. In 1990 it sold its nine Great Southern Hotels, including its hotel in Derry, Northern Ireland, to Aer Rianta, the airports authority.

Financial losses and the future
CIÉ was established to provide road and railway transport, and later took on some of the canals and ports. It was empowered as both a provider and a licensor of other providers.

For most of its existence CIÉ, in particular its railways division, made large losses and was subsidised by the taxpayer. This provoked demands from the public and politicians to "make CIÉ pay". In a similar pattern that seen in many other countries, Ireland's railways were accordingly rationalised, and suffered severe cutbacks while at the same time the road division was expanded.

The Baker Tilly report found an amount of corporate malpractice in 2004–08. CIÉ did not pass on the report to the Minister for Transport until it was mentioned in the media.

Losses in 2009:
 Iarnród Éireann/Irish Rail — €4.0m
 Bus Éireann — €54.1m

The biggest change to CIÉ's operational structure since 1987 came with the establishment of the National Transport Authority in December 2009, which has powers over CIÉ's operations in the Greater Dublin Area. The Dublin Transport Authority Act, 2008 also gives the Minister for Transport instead of the chairman of CIÉ the power to appoint the directors of the subsidiary companies. CIÉ receives public service obligation payments to support the provision of services on most of its routes.

In 2013, Dublin Bus and Bus Éireann made a profit of €500,000 and €400,000 respectively, for the first time in a number of years.

See also

 Coaching stock of Ireland
 Diesel locomotives of Ireland
 Multiple units of Ireland
 Rail transport in Ireland
 Steam locomotives of Ireland
 Transport in Ireland

References

External links 

 

 
Rail transport in Northern Ireland
Rail transport in the Republic of Ireland
Railway companies of the Republic of Ireland
1945 establishments in Ireland
Irish companies established in 1945
Irish gauge railways